Quicksilver Messenger Service is the debut studio album of Quicksilver Messenger Service, released in 1968.

History
This was Quicksilver Messenger Service's first album, although they had already produced two songs for the soundtrack of the 1968 movie Revolution. The album displays the group's jam sound amidst lighter pop-oriented songs.  Unlike contemporaries such as the Grateful Dead, Quicksilver's jams were highly planned as can be heard by comparing the studio versions of songs with those from bootleg live performances. Gary Duncan and John Cipollina displayed innovative duelling lead guitars, which can be seen on extended jam tracks such as "Gold and Silver".

"Dino's Song" was written by 
Dino Valenti who was at that time in prison due to marijuana-related offenses.

Track listing

Side one
"Pride of Man" – 4:08 (Hamilton Camp)	 
"Light Your Windows" – 2:38 (Gary Duncan, David Freiberg)	 
"Dino's Song" – 3:08 (Dino Valenti) 
"Gold and Silver" – 6:43 (Gary Duncan, Steve Schuster)

Side two
"It's Been Too Long" – 3:01 (Ron Polte)	 
"The Fool" – 12:07 (Gary Duncan, David Freiberg)

Personnel
Quicksilver Messenger Service
 John Cipollina - lead guitar
 Gary Duncan - rhythm and lead guitar, vocals
 David Freiberg - bass guitar, vocals, viola
 Greg Elmore - drums

Charts
 Album

Billboard (United States)

References

Quicksilver Messenger Service albums
1968 debut albums
Capitol Records albums
Albums produced by Nick Gravenites
Albums with cover art by Rick Griffin